Kadiri is a major city in Sri Sathya Sai District the Indian state of Andhra Pradesh. It is a Special Grade Municipal City Council and headquarters of Kadiri Mandal and Kadiri Revenue Division. Kadiri Taluka ('Tehsil') was the largest taluk in the state of Andhra Pradesh when there was taluka system in Andhra Pradesh Kadiri is known for its jasmine and saffron flowers. Kadiri saffron is widely sold in Andhra and Karnataka. The Sri Lakshmi Narasimhaswamy Temple is reminiscent of Kadiri to the people of Karnataka, Telangana And Tamil Nadu. The name of Kadiri has also some interesting past. The habitation was initially named as Khadripuram (Telugu: ఖాద్రీపురం) as ‘khadara’ plants were largely found in the surrounding forests and Khadri has later transformed as Kadiri.

Attractions

Sri Khadri Lakshmi Narasimha Swamy Temple 
Lakshmi Narasimha Swamy temple is located in Kadiri Anantpur district of Andhra Pradesh state in India. According to Hindu Mythology Lord Narasimha emerged as Swayambhu from roots of Kadiri tree to assassin Hiranyakashyap. Idol of Lord Narasimha oozes sweat after daily sacred bath or Abhishek which is a distinct quality of this idol. This pilgrimage is a hub for Hindu devotees. Festival is celebrated with great pomp and shows in Kadiri every year. The place is named Kadiri after Lord Lakshmi Narasimha swamy who emanated from Kadiri tree. Kadiri refers to Canary wood or Indian Mulberry.

Thimmamma Marrimanu 

Thimmamma Marrimanu is a huge banyan tree which is located at about 25 km from Kadiri. This historical tree is situated in the district of Ananthpur. The name of this tree is preserved by the local people since ancient times.Thimmamma Marrimanu, The word ‘marri’ means banyan and ‘manu’ means tree in Telugu language. Many people visit the place to worship and to let their souls relax in the peaceful ambience. The route is quite exciting while getting here as it goes through fields and little villages and it makes the visitors journey enjoyable.A small temple dedicated to Thimmamma is beneath the tree. The residents of the region strongly believe that if a childless couple worships Thimmamma they will beget a child in the next year. A large jatara is conducted at Thimmamma on the day of the Shivaratri festival, when thousands flock to the tree to worship it

Batrepalli waterfalls 
The Batrepalli waterfalls are located in Talupula mandal, near Kadiri, of Anantapuram district. They are active from September to December. Water begins to flow from the Mallalamma temple in the Nilgiri forest and goes on to join the Batrepalli pond. The falls are located close to Kadapa district as well as Karnataka. During the holiday season, they turn into a busy picnic spot.

K. Rajasekhar, a former municipal councillor from Kadiri, says, “We feel that the Batrepalli waterfalls provide a suitable picnic spot for four months a year, during the rainy season, in an otherwise dry area.” He said devotees who visit the Lord Lakshmi Narasimhaswamy temple of Kadiri often make a stop at the falls, which provides an open, green landscape.

Yogi VemanaSamadhi 
Kattarupalli attracts a lot of pilgrims as it is known for the Yogi VemanaSamadhi situated 25 km from Kadiri enroute Thimmama Marimanu. The journey to this place offers views of rock formations of various shapes. Yogi Vemana is widely known as people's poet as the Telugu poems written by him are simple and colloquial, narrating the truths of ones day-to-day life and social evils which are very popular among the literates and illiterates. His poems describe the subjects of Yoga, wisdom and morality. Vemana being a poet was known as the ‘Praja Kavi’, meaning ‘The Poet of the People

Chandravandana and Mohiyar 
Chandravadana and Mohiyar were a pair of lovers from the town of Kadiri, Andhra Pradesh, India. According to the legend, Chandravadana was a local Hindu and Mohiyar was a traveling Muslim; their union involved supernatural events, which proved that it was blessed by God. This story is thought to explain the peaceful coexistence of the large populations of Hindus and Muslims in the town today.

Transport

Roads 

Kadiri is situated on NH-42(Formerly NH-205 The Chennai-Mumbai Highway Constructed in 1800s by British Raj) Which Connects Kadiri With all major cities including Hyderabad, Tirupati, Anantapur, Chennai, Kurnool And 3 State Highways originates from Here which are

1.Kadiri - Jammalamadugu Highway (Merged into NH716G)

2.Kadiri - Hindupur Road (Merged into NH716G)

3.Kadiri - Rajampeta Road 

Kadiri is classified as a 'sector' in Bangalore Majestic Terminal 3, undertaking some of the major towns of Kadapa District including Pulivendula, Jammalamadugu and Proddatur.

Kadiri have Scores of buses to Anantapur, Hindupur, Madanapalle, Pulivendula, Rayachoti, Bangalore, Puttaparthi, Chennai And Hyderabad which is operated by APSRTC. Kadiri 'APSRTC DEPO' is the second largest bus depot in Anantapur District.
 
A new bypass to Kadiri has been sanctioned for Rs 240 crores to alleviate traffic congestion caused by heavy load lorries travelling to Bangalore, Chennai, Tirupati, Anantapur, and other cities. This bypass is due to take the place of the previous bypass. This bypass is to include three flyovers, one at the Kadiri-Anantapur highway, one at the Kadiri-Bangalore road, and one at the sunnapugutta thanda. It will be 13 kilometres long. The construction is progressing at a rapid pace, with the belt on the Kadiri-Anantapur highway and the Pulivendula road having been finished.

Railways 

Kadiri Railway Station is situated in Dharmavaram-Pakala Branch Line which is a very old railway line which was constructed in the year 1891 and converted into BG in the year 2010 and electrified in the year 2020–2021. Kadiri have a Daily Express Trains To Hyderabad, Tirupati, Vijayawada, Nellore, Ongole and Bi-weekly Train connecting Amravati of Maharastra and Super-Fast Train To Mumbai And Nagercoil (Kanyakumari), Chittoor, Katpadi Four days a week and  A weekly express to Madurai and Daily Passenger Trains To Guntakal and Tirupati

History of Kadiri Taluk 
Kadiri Taluk was founded under the British Raj and was located in the Kadapa district. However, in the year 1910, it was incorporated into the Anantapur district. At the time, Kadiri Taluk was the largest taluk in Andhra Pradesh, with roughly 210 villages under its administration. Kadiri, Mudiguba, Nallamada, N.P. Kunta, Talupula, Nallacheruvu, O.D.Cheruvu, Tanakal, Amadagur, and Gandlapenta are the revenue mandals where the villages are now located. Except for Mudigubba, these mandals are currently under the Kadiri revenue division. It now includes Puttaparthi, nallamada, Kothacheruvu Mandals as well.

Topography 
The Kadiri town is locate at 78.170 East Longitude and 14.120 North Latitude and has an average elevation of 504.00 meters (1653 feet) above MSL. Kadiri is surrounded by hill and hillocks on two sides on the North and East.

The terrain of the town is generally sloping from North and Central area, East to West and South to Central area. The Highest contour is + 546.000 m (South West) and lowest contour is + 496.000m (west).

The town is situated in the center of the Kadiri Taluk between Anantapur, Madanapalli towns and it is situated in Anantapur District and which is 90 km distance from Anantapur. The Municipality is divided into 36 Election Wards. It is surrounded on two sides while the Sudda Vagu River Flows to its West.

Climate and Rainfall 
The Climate is a tropical in Kadiri. In winter there is much more Rainfall in Kadiri than in summer. In December, the temperature is 23.60 C during day time. The night temperature will be 160C and is the lowest temperature of the whole year. During summer from March to May when the Max Temperature in the hottest month of May rises to 480C.

    In cools down as soon as the South – West Monsoon breaks out in the month of June. The annual average rainfall in the town is around 700mm from both North-East & South-West Monsoons. The rainfall mainly occurs during the rainy season i.e., from June to September due to South – West Monsoons. Rains during the month October, November and also December occur due to North-East monsoon is about twenty percent of the total annual rainfall.

Environmental issues 
The Rainfall is sparse and spasmodic. Borewells provide the ray of hope for drinking water purposes.  There are no perennial rivers in the vicinity of Kadiri which results in excess dependence on underground water.  Over exploitation of ground water and indiscriminate drilling of bores for the past few years has caused depletion of the ground water table and drying of bore wells in most cases. The water is being supplied to the public in every two days through Chitravathi Balancing Reservoir.

Demographics 
As of 2001 India census, Kadiri is a Municipality city in district of Anantapur, Andhra Pradesh. The Kadiri Municipality has a population of 89,429 of which 44,375 are males while 45,054 are females as per a report released by Census India 2011. The population figures for the town as per census records are available since 1901 from the Municipality. The population figures are given in below Table.

As per 2001 Census report, the population  of the towards  76261 and it increased to 89240 in year 2011 Census report thus recording 17.02% decadal growth. The density of population comes to be about 3500 persons per Sq. km. Demographic Studies revealed a population of 135000 for Ultimate Year i.e., 2047 and 115000 for prospective year i.e., 2032.

Government and politics

Civic Administration 

It was constituted as Municipality in the year 1964 as   III Grade Municipality and was upgraded as II Grade Municipality in 1999 Then Upgraded To Special Grade Municipality.

Politics

Urban Poor 
There are 35 poor settlements both notified and un-notified.  Of the total population of the town of 89240, the population in the Notified Poor Settlements is 51458 constituting 60% of total population of town as per 2011 census.  This shows that most of the poor people are living in the slums.  The poorest of the poor live in a state or utter dependency as casual labour and petty artisans, struggling to make both ends meet, barely surviving on the margin of life, sunk neck-deep in the whirlpool of poverty.  As a result of low rainfall and recurring droughts, depletion of underground water table and lack of irrigation, poor people living in the surrounding villages migrate to the town in search of a better life.  This exodus of poor from villages surround the town in search of better livelihood opportunities resulting in a continuous extension of existing poor settlements and creation of new settlements of the poor.  Many poor people inhabit village poramboke sites or farmer villages on the outskirts of the town.  The merger of three panchayats in the Municipality and migration of poor people from the surrounding villages in search of some sort of livelihood contributed to the emergence of large number of poor settlements without any basic civic amenities and services, like shelter, drainage, water supply, health, education and livelihood.

Economy 

Kadiri is one of the important Agriculture Centre in Anantapuramu District, being surrounded by number of villages whose activity is mainly agriculture. The major crops cultivated here are Paddy, Jowar, Tobacco and cotton. Other crops that are grown here are Groundnuts, Sunflower, Toor dal, Mustard seeds and Sugar cane. The vegetation of most famous Tamoto has its native here. Other vegetables include Chillies, Ridge Gourd, Beans, Cluster Beans. All types of leafy vegetables are grown here. The soil here is of mixed varieties making it suitable to grow many crops.

NP Kunta Ultra Mega Solar Park Established in Kadiri Constituency

Education 
The primary and secondary school education is imparted by government, aided and private schools, under the School Education Department of the state.

Groundnut Agricultural Research Centre, Kadiri (a unit of Acharya N.G. Ranga Agricultural University)
Agricultural Research Station, Acharya NG Ranga Agricultural University Kadiri, Ananthapuramu, District, Andhra Pradesh, Is one of the five major lead centres of Groundnut Research in India under AICRP G of ICAR- Directorate of Groundnut Research, Junagadh, Gujarat State. Catering the Research and Developmental needs of Groundnut crop in AP. This research station have released 15 new High Yielding groundnut varieties Kadiri 1 (1971) Kadiri 2 (1978) Kadiri 3 (1978), Vemana (1993), Kadiri 4 (1995), Kadiri 5 (2002), Kadiri 6 (2002), Kadiri 7 bold (2009), Kadiri 8 (2009), Kadiri 9 (2009), Kadiri Anantha (2010), Kadiri Harithandhra (2010), Kadiri Amaravati (2016), Kadiri Chitravathi (2020), Kadiri Lepakshi 1812 (2020) for general cultivation in the farmers fields.
Sericulture Research Institute, Kutagulla village, Kadiri Mandal.
Govt Junior College Separate For Both Boys And Girls on Bypass Road 
Govt Polytechnic Kadiri
STSN Govt Degree And PG College
Municipal High Schools 
Municipal Urdu Schools

See also
Chandravadana and Mohiyar
Kadiri (Assembly constituency)
Kadiri Revenue Division

References 

Cities and towns in Sri Sathya Sai district
Mandal headquarters in Sri Sathya Sai district
Cities in Andhra Pradesh